Women's Slalom World Cup 1984/1985

Calendar

Final point standings

In Women's Slalom World Cup 1984/85 the best 5 results count. Erika Hess won her fourth Slalom World Cup.

References
 fis-ski.com

World Cup
FIS Alpine Ski World Cup slalom women's discipline titles